AviAlliance is an airport management company headquartered in Düsseldorf, Germany. The company was founded in 1997 as Hochtief AirPort, a subsidiary of the international construction service provider Hochtief. Since 27 September 2013, the company has been owned by a subsidiary of the Public Sector Pension Investment Board.

Airports
AviAlliance acquires interests in privatized airports and operates them - together with the other shareholders - as independent commercial enterprises. AviAlliance supports the operational and economic management of airport holdings, but also provides services to other airports and companies in airport-related industries, such as commissioning, retail design, as an international transaction manager or when creating master plans, in construction project and sustainability management. In 2005, the former HTA together with the Australian Hastings Funds Management Ltd., the Canadian Caisse de dépôt et placement du Québec and the German KfW IPEX-Bank launched AviAlliance Capital (formerly Hochtief AirPort Capital (HTAC)). In the process, the then HTA contributed shares in the airport holdings to the partnership.

As of 31 May 2017, AviAlliance holds shares in the following airports:
Athens International Airport 26.667% directly, 13.333% via AviAlliance Capital GmbH & Co. KGaA
Budapest Ferenc Liszt International Airport 55.44%
Düsseldorf Airport 20% directly, 10% via AviAlliance Capital GmbH & Co. KGaA
Hamburg Airport 34.8% directly, 14.2% via AviAlliance Capital GmbH & Co. KGaA
San Juan Airport 40%

Competitors 
Rival businesses in the international airport management sector include Frankfurt based Fraport, the Spanish Ferrovial and the French Aéroports de Paris and Vinci.

References

External links

Airport operators
Transport operators of Germany
Companies based in North Rhine-Westphalia